The Charles Sturt Adelaide International was a tennis tournament held in West Lakes, Australia in 2013 and 2014. The event was part of the ATP Challenger Tour and was played on hard courts.

Past finals

Singles

Doubles

References

External links

 
ATP Challenger Tour
Tennis tournaments in Australia
Hard court tennis tournaments
Charles Sturt